Thaddeus Rowe Luckinbill (born April 24, 1975) is an American actor and producer best known for playing J.T. Hellstrom on the CBS soap opera The Young and the Restless, from August 1999 to November 2010. He reprised the role of J.T. in December 2017.

Personal life
Thad Luckinbill has an identical twin brother, Trent, who is 12 minutes his junior. Trent Luckinbill is a lawyer who lives in Los Angeles.  In the final episode of the television series Law & Order: Criminal Intent, "To the Boy in the Blue Knit Cap", Trent briefly appeared as the identical twin murder victim/corpse lying beside the murder victim/corpse of the character played by Thad.

Luckinbill married Young and the Restless co-star Amelia Heinle in March 2007 while their characters were also married on the show. He is stepfather to Heinle's son, August, from her previous marriage to Michael Weatherly. Their first child together, a son, Thaddeus Rowe, was born on November 2, 2007.[5] Their second child, a daughter, Georgia March, was born on December 17, 2009. On March 1, 2017, Luckinbill filed for divorce from Heinle, citing "irreconcilable differences". However, as of late 2019, they are not divorced.

Luckinbill enjoys playing volleyball, surfing, boxing and going to the gym. He occasionally plays for the Hollywood Knights basketball team. He majored in business finance at the University of Oklahoma.

Luckinbill is a cousin of fellow actor Laurence Luckinbill -- the son-in-law of comedienne Lucille Ball and husband to entertainer Luci Arnaz, and more distantly related to film directors Lana and Lilly Wachowski.

Acting career

Television
In addition to his role as J.T. Hellstrom on The Young and the Restless, Thad Luckinbill has guest-starred on several primetime television shows, including Undressed, Buffy the Vampire Slayer, Providence, Sabrina, the Teenage Witch, Nash Bridges, 8 Simple Rules, Without a Trace, CSI: NY, Nip/Tuck, Ghost Whisperer, CSI: Miami,
CSI: Crime Scene Investigation, and Major Crimes. He was a recurring character on The CW show Nikita completing six episodes as Nathan, the neighbor and love interest of Alexandra Udinov (Lyndsy Fonseca), before the show was cancelled after its fourth season.  Fonseca was also Luckinbill's former Young and the Restless co-star.

In 2001, Luckinbill was also featured in an episode of the MTV documentary series True Life and appeared in Madonna's "Don't Tell Me" video as the cowboy who was thrown from his horse at the end of the song. On November 3, 2017, it was announced that Luckinbill would reprise his portrayal of J.T. on The Young and the Restless, beginning December 12, 2017. His run ended on April 13, 2018, when J.T. was hit on the back of the head by Nikki Newman with a fireplace poker and killed.

Producer
In 2013, Thad, with his twin brother Trent, and producer Molly Smith (producer of P.S. I Love You and The Blind Side) started a production company called Black Label Media. The production company has worked with A-listers such as Reese Witherspoon, Emily Blunt, and Jake Gyllenhaal, producing films including Sicario starring Blunt, Josh Brolin, and Benicio Del Toro, The Good Lie starring Witherspoon, and Demolition starring Gyllenhaal, Naomi Watts, and Chris Cooper.

Filmography

Film

Television

References

External links
 
 

1975 births
Living people
20th-century American male actors
21st-century American male actors
Actors from Enid, Oklahoma
American male film actors
American male soap opera actors
American male television actors
American male voice actors
Enid High School alumni
Film producers from Oklahoma
Identical twin male actors
Male actors from Oklahoma
American twins
University of Oklahoma alumni